Richard Blyke (died 1775) was an English official and antiquary.

Life
The son of Theophilus Blyke, deputy secretary-at-war, he was a native of Hereford. He became deputy-auditor of the office of the Imprest; and was a Fellow of the Royal Society and Fellow of the Society of Antiquaries of London. He was a member of the committee appointed to prepare the Rolls of Parliament for the press. 

Blyke died in 1775, and was buried in the churchyard of Isleworth, Middlesex.

Works
Blyke edited, with John Topham, John Glanville's Reports of Determinations on Contested Elections (1775). He also made manuscript collections, in 22 volumes, for a topographical history of Herefordshire. These were purchased at the sale of his library by Charles Howard, 11th Duke of Norfolk.

References

Attribution

Year of birth missing
1775 deaths
English antiquarians
Fellows of the Royal Society
Fellows of the Society of Antiquaries of London
People from Hereford